Home Tract, also known as Woodville, is a historic home located at Ivy, Albemarle County, Virginia. The main house consists of a 2½-story, hall-parlor-plan frame dwelling with a two-story brick addition. A frame rear ell was added to the brick section about 1920.  The interiors feature late Georgian and Greek Revival-style detailing. Also on the property is "The Cottage," one-story frame building with a stucco exterior, a metal-sheathed gable roof, and a Victorian front porch; a meathouse, and wellhouse.

It was added to the National Register of Historic Places in 1999.

References

Houses on the National Register of Historic Places in Virginia
Georgian architecture in Virginia
Greek Revival houses in Virginia
Houses completed in 1840
Houses in Albemarle County, Virginia
National Register of Historic Places in Albemarle County, Virginia